Pongsak Maneetong (born May 3, 1986) is a Thai weightlifter.

He competed in Weightlifting at the 2008 Summer Olympics in the 56 kg division finishing tenth, with 258 kg, beating his personal best by 5 kg.

He is 5 ft 4 inches tall and weighs 128 lb.

Pongsak Maneetong
1986 births
Living people
Weightlifters at the 2008 Summer Olympics
Pongsak Maneetong
Pongsak Maneetong
Pongsak Maneetong
Southeast Asian Games medalists in weightlifting
Competitors at the 2007 Southeast Asian Games
Pongsak Maneetong